Jean Aurel (6 November 1925 in Rastolita, Romania – 24 August 1996 in Paris) was a Romanian-born French film director and scriptwriter. Notably, he co-wrote La Femme d'à côté (The Woman Next Door) with François Truffaut and Suzanne Schiffman.

Selected filmography
 Mata Hari's Daughter (1954)
 Frou-Frou (1955)
 Maid in Paris (1956)
 Women's Club (1956)
 It Happened in Aden (1956)
 Gates of Paris (1957)
 Une Parisienne (1957)
 Taxi, Roulotte et Corrida (1958)
 Le Trou (1960)
 Please, Not Now! (1961)
 14-18 (1963)
 De l'amour (1964)
 Lamiel (1967)
 Manon 70 (1968)
  (1969)
 Vivre ensemble (1973 – actor)
 Like a Pot of Strawberries (1974)
 Love on the Run (1979)
 The Woman Next Door (1981)
 Confidentially Yours (aka Finally, Sunday!; 1983)

External links
 

1925 births
1996 deaths
French film directors
French male screenwriters
20th-century French screenwriters
French male film actors
20th-century French male actors
Romanian emigrants to France
20th-century French male writers